Rawlins Township is one of twenty-three townships in Jo Daviess County, Illinois, USA.  As of the 2010 census, its population was 455 and it contained 189 housing units.  It was formed as Grant Township from West Galena Township on July 12, 1887; its name changed to Rawlins Township on December 20, 1887 in honor of Galena resident John Aaron Rawlins.

Geography

Cities, towns, villages
 Galena.

Major highways
  U.S. Route 20.
  Illinois Route 84.

Demographics

School districts
 Galena Unit School District 120.

Political districts
 Illinois' 16th congressional district.
 State House District 89.
 State Senate District 45.

References
 
 United States Census Bureau 2007 TIGER/Line Shapefiles.
 United States National Atlas.

External links
 Jo Daviess County official site.
 City-Data.com.
 Illinois State Archives.
 Township Officials of Illinois.

Townships in Jo Daviess County, Illinois
Townships in Illinois